The Dalton Collegians were a semi-professional independent baseball team located in Dalton, Massachusetts. The team was founded in 1970 and coached by Michael T. Casey of Dalton, MA. In 1987, Mr. Casey became involved with an investor group who purchased and moved the Little Falls Mets from Little Falls, NY to Pittsfield, MA.

The Dalton Collegians had many notable local and college baseball players that graduated to many levels of professional baseball.  In 1985, the Dalton Collegians were ranked as one of the top amateur semi-professional teams in the country. The Collegians beat the Baltimore Johnnies, who at the time were considered to be one of the top ranked semi-professional teams in the county as ranked by the World Baseball Congress.  The Baltimore Johnnies couching staff were affiliated with the Milwaukee Brewers.

History
The Dalton Collegians followed the deep traditions of local and community baseball in Massachusetts. The Collegians played most of their home games in Dalton, MA which is situated next to Pittsfield, MA in Berkshire County. The Collegians, because of their success and skill as a semi-professional team, were invited to play at Wahconah Park on occasion. Wahconah Park remains one of the last remaining ballparks in the United States with a wooden grandstand; it was constructed in 1919 and seats 4,500.

Pittsfield, Massachusetts is noted in a document believed to be the earliest written reference to baseball in North America. The document was located in the city of Pittsfield's library, the Berkshire Athenaeum. The reference is contained in a 1791 Pittsfield bylaw, which states that: ". . . for the Preservation of the Windows in the New Meeting House . . . no Person or Inhabitant of said town, shall be permitted to play at any game called Wicket, Cricket, Baseball, Football, Cat, Fives or any other game or games with balls, within the Distance of Eighty Yards from said Meeting House."

Rise to the majors
Many notable professional baseball players honed their skills during the summer months with the Dalton Collegians.  Twenty-three players signed professional contracts with minor league teams from 1970 thru 1987.  

Jeff Reardon
Turk Wendell
Dan Duquette, General Manager, Red Sox
Jim Duquette, General Manager of the New York Mets and Baltimore Orioles

See also
History of baseball in the United States

References

External links
 https://archive.today/20130416073324/http://www.unico-of-pittsfield.org/halloffame.htm
 http://sportsillustrated.cnn.com/vault/article/magazine/MAG1005025/2/index.htm
 https://web.archive.org/web/20090721171602/http://www.pittsfield-ma.org/subpage.asp?ID=226
 http://sports.espn.go.com/mlb/news/story?id=1799618

1970 establishments in Massachusetts
Baseball teams established in 1970